Esom Hill is an unincorporated community in Polk County, in the U.S. state of Georgia.

History
The first permanent settlement at Esom Hill was made in 1848. A post office called Esom Hill has been in operation since 1850. The community's name honors the Esom family.

References

Unincorporated communities in Polk County, Georgia
Unincorporated communities in Georgia (U.S. state)